Frédéric de Coninck (2 December 1740 – 4 September 1811) was a Dutch merchant and shipowner active in Copenhagen, Denmark.

Biography
Frédéric de Coninck was born at The Hague in the Netherlands. In 1763, he moved to Copenhagen to set up a foreign trade and shipping company. He became one of Denmark's largest shipowners, with a fleet of 64 vessels at the company's height. He took advantage of Denmark's neutrality during the Napoleonic Wars to boost his and the country's trade, but his company got into difficulties during and after the English Wars, having to shut down in 1822.

Personal life
In 1797, he had his residence De Coninck House built in Copenhagen. During the 1780s, he acquired the Dronninggaard estate at Holte and engaged the architect Andreas Kirkerup to design a manor house at which he died during 1811.  
His daughter  Marie Henriette de Coninck (1774–1843)  married Danish merchant William Duntzfelt (1762-1809). Their daughter 
Cécile Olivia Duntzfelt (1798-1863)  was the mother of Danish-born American doctor Henry Jacques Garrigues (1831–1913).

de Coninck ships
Hussaren

References

External links
 Frédéric de Coninck og Dronninggaard : en mosaik af tekster og billeder / [udgivet af] Jens B. Friis-Hansen og Finn Slente. 1987. 
 Joan Harders: Frederic de Coninck : en omstridt forretningsmand fra den florissante handelstid. I: Erhvervshistorisk årbog. Bind 38 (1988). Side 106–141.
 Helge Krausing: De sigtede bag tiltalen ved Højesteret for landsforrædderi under englændernes belejring af København i 1807. I: Krigshistorisk tidsskrift. Årgang 35, nr. 2 (1999). Side 28–31.
 Eva Cater: Mageløs oplevelse. Interview med Tom Sjørup. I: Berlingske tidende. 2001-01-24.
 Torsten Søgaard: Marie de Conincks dagbøger 1793–1815. I: Søllerødbogen. 2007. Side 7-53.
 Peter Henningsen: Patrioterne i Lyngby : en liden fortælling om handlinger så ædle og uegennyttige, at det turde være løgn. Nordsjælland 1807. I: Fortid og nutid. 2007, hæfte 4. Side 243–262.

1740 births
1811 deaths
18th-century Danish businesspeople
19th-century Danish businesspeople
Danish businesspeople in shipping
18th-century Danish landowners
19th-century Danish landowners
Businesspeople from The Hague
Dutch emigrants to Denmark